A stick-built home is a wooden house constructed entirely or largely on-site; that is, built on the site which it is intended to occupy upon its completion rather than in a factory or similar facility. This term is used to contrast such a dwelling with mobile homes and modular homes that are assembled in a factory and transported to the site entirely or mostly complete and hence are not "stick-built".

Stick-built homes are also those homes which are built using a more traditional method of construction rather than a modular type. The "sticks" mentioned usually refer specifically to the superstructure of the walls and roof.

Most stick-built homes have many of the same things in common. They are usually built with lumber, though it is possible to use metal poles for the construction as well. This is more expensive, more time-consuming and generally harder for the homeowner to deal with once constructed. These homes also have many of the common features associated with most homes, such as shingles and drywall.

See also
 

House types